A tellurite tellurate is a chemical compound or salt that contains tellurite and tellurate anions (TeO32- and TeO42-). These are mixed anion compounds. Some have third anions.

Naming 
A tellurite tellurate compound may also be called a tellurate tellurite.

Production 
One way to produce a tellurite tellurate compound is by heating oxides together.

Properties

Monoclinic and orthorhombic dominate crystal structures of the tellurite tellurates. Most compounds are transparent from near ultraviolet to the near infrared. Te-O bonds cause absorption lines in infrared.

Related 
Related to these are the selenate selenites and sulfate sulfites by varying the chalcogen.

List

References

Tellurates
Tellurites
Mixed anion compounds
Mixed valence compounds